The 2008–09 Primera División season is the 77th professional season of Uruguay's top-flight football league.

Teams

Torneo Apertura

Apertura tiebreaker

Top-ten goalscorers

Last Updated: February 9, 2009

Torneo Clausura

Villa Española was relegated due to financial issues after the Apertura.

Top-ten goalscorers

Last Updated: June 18, 2009

Results
Results tables includes scores from both the Apertura and Clausura tournaments.

Aggregate table

Relegation table

Championship playoffs

Semifinals

First leg

Second leg

Third leg

Nacional won 5–2 on points.

Finals

First Leg

Second leg

Nacional won 6–0 on points.

Nacional qualified for 2010 Copa Libertadores Second Stage.

Liguilla Pre-Libertadores

Liguilla 4th place tiebreaker
Since Liverpool and Defensor Sporting tied on points and goal difference in the Liguilla, a playoff was needed to determine who earned the Uruguay 2 spot in the 2009 Copa Sudamericana First Stage.

Top goalscorers

Last Updated: August 2, 2009

See also
2008–09 in Uruguayan football

References

2008-09
1
Uru
Uru